The John Monash Science School is a government-funded co-educational academically selective and specialist secondary day school, located on the  campus of Monash University, in Melbourne, Victoria, Australia. The school specialises in science and technologies and is the state's first specialist science secondary school.  A joint venture between the Government of Victoria and Monash University, the school opened in 2009 with one Year 10 class; and as of 2010 it was running at its full capacity of approximately 660 students. The school is named in honour of Sir John Monash.

Overview
It is one of three recently built selective high schools in Victoria alongside Suzanne Cory High School and Nossal High School. The addition of these schools are the result of a policy of expansion, and doubles the number of fully selective government schools in Victoria. Prior to these schools, Mac.Robertson Girls' High School, Melbourne High School and the Victorian College of the Arts Secondary School were the sole selective entry schools in Victoria. John Monash Science School has an interview process alongside an entrance examination for admittance. 

More than 1000 students apply annually for the 200 places offered by John Monash Science School.

A variety of elective subjects are offered in Year 10 at John Monash Science School which cover nanotechnology, marine biology, biomedicine, geology (terraforming mars), bioinformatics, astrophysics, Pharmaceutical Sciences and Materials Science. Year 10 students also do a year-long project named EEI (Extended Experimental Investigation), this results in a presentation at the John Monash Science School Science Fair.

John Monash Science School was ranked 7th out of all state secondary schools in Victoria based on VCE results in 2019.

House system

The student body is divided into four houses:

  Flannery (green, house mascot a griffin)
  Blackburn (purple, house mascot a phoenix)
  Wood (grey, house mascot a wolf)
  Doherty (blue, house mascot a dragon)

Each house is named after an accomplished Australian scientist: Tim Flannery, Elizabeth Blackburn, Fiona Wood, and Peter Doherty respectively.

NBN Virtual School of Emerging Sciences
On 13 February 2013, the NBN Virtual School of Emerging Sciences (NVSES) was launched in a coalition effort between John Monash Science School, Monash University, and Pearson Education. Utilizing the Australian government's National Broadband Network's (NBN) educational facilities, lessons are taught by JMSS staff and Monash University scientists via internet to schools all around Australia. Two subjects are currently offered: astrophysics (which leads on to quantum physics) and nanoscience (leading on to nanotechnology).

See also

 List of schools in Victoria
 Monash Tech School

References

External links
 
 Dept. of Education website
 NBN Virtual School of Emerging Sciences official website

Public high schools in Melbourne
Selective schools in Victoria (Australia)
Educational institutions established in 2010
2010 establishments in Australia
Monash University
Buildings and structures in the City of Monash